Eedu is a village in Karkala, Udupi district in the state of Karnataka, India.

Villages in Udupi district